The 1994 Salem Open was a men's tennis tournament played on outdoor hard courts on Hong Kong Island in Hong Kong that was part of the World Series of the 1994 ATP Tour. It was the 19th edition of the tournament and was held from 11 April through 17 April 1994. First-seeded Michael Chang won the singles title.

Finals

Singles
 Michael Chang defeated  Patrick Rafter 6–1, 6–3
 It was Chang's 3rd singles title of the year and the 16th of his career.

Doubles
 Jim Grabb /  Brett Steven defeated  Jonas Björkman /  Patrick Rafter walkover
 It was Grabb's 1st doubles title of the year and the 15th of his career. It was Steven's 1st doubles title of the year and the 2nd of his career.

References

External links
 ITF tournament edition details

Salem Open
Hong Kong Open (tennis)
1994 in Hong Kong sport